"Dancing with the Devil" is a song by American singer Demi Lovato. It was released on March 26, 2021 by Island Records as the third single from Lovato's seventh studio album Dancing with the Devil... the Art of Starting Over. The singer co-wrote the song with Bianca Atterberry, John Ho, and its producer Mitch Allan. The song debuted and peaked at number 56 on the Billboard Hot 100 and reached top 50 in the UK and number 7 in Hungary.

Background and composition 

"Dancing with the Devil" was featured in the trailer for Lovato's 2021 documentary Demi Lovato: Dancing with the Devil and is the second track from the album Dancing with the Devil... the Art of Starting Over. Set in the key of C minor, the vocal range spans nearly three octaves, from E♭3 to B♭5.

The song begins with currently recovered Lovato chronicling a 2018 substance dependency relapse, which would lead to a near-fatal overdose later that same year. The opening verses describe the relapse's initial phase, which was primarily with red wine: "It's just a little red wine, I'll be fine/ Not like I wanna do this every night/ I've been good, don't I deserve it? I think I've earned it/ Feels like it's worth it in my mind." The second verse describes an introduction to heavier drugs: "A little white line" that eventually became "a little glass pipe."

Ultimately, Lovato becomes addicted to smoking heroin, singing "Tinfoil remedy almost got the best of me," and confessing in the pre-chorus that during this time, "I told you I was OK, but I was lying." The track's chorus, "almost made it to heaven" by "playing with the enemy / gambling with my soul", refers to a past overdose. Lovato also sings about the grip that addiction had and the psychological difficulty it imposed, repeating throughout the song "It's so hard to say no / When you're dancing with the devil".

Lyric video 
A lyric video was released with various visually muddled graphics, including imagery of an ocean, flames of a fire, and butterflies.

Music video 
The video for "Dancing with the Devil" is a detailed re-creation of the events involved in Lovato's 2018 drug overdose, sexual assault, and harrowing near-death experience, as well as the aftermath in the hospital the days after. The music video is a re-enactment, and includes the green jacket worn that night with scenes of substance abuse at a party, followed by proceeding home and unzipping of the drug dealer's duffel bag in Lovato's bedroom, and later the drug dealer looming ominously over the singer's unconscious and unclothed body, presumably after a sexual assault. The paramedics are then shown reviving and transporting Lovato to the hospital, where a neck tube is sewn in, in order to pump out blood, clean it, and pump it back in. This is followed by scenes of family and friends shuddering at the hospital during the first post-overdose day, when survival was in doubt. Finally Lovato wakes up, and is given a sponge bath by a nurse, which reveals a "survivor" tattoo near where the neck blood tube used to be.

Critical reception 
Prior to its release, "Dancing with the Devil" was described by Shana Naomi Krochmal of Entertainment Weekly as "evok[ing] Adele's "Skyfall" theme". Billboard described the song as "powerful" and "confessional". Rob Harvilla of The Ringer, describes the song as "an expert slow-burn barrage of Bond Movie Theme extravagant melodrama."

Credits and personnel
Recording and management
Engineered at Westlake Recording Studios, The Hollywood Compound (Los Angeles, California), The Sonic Church (Brentwood, Tennessee)
Mixed at MixStar Studios (Virginia Beach, Virginia)
Mastered at Sterling Sound Studios (Edgewater, New Jersey)
Published by DDLovato Music/Universal Music Corp. (ASCAP), Seven Summits Music obo itself and High Rise Life Publishing (BMI), John Ho (ASCAP), Money Making Machine, I Just Can't Read Music (ASCAP) administered by Kobalt Songs Music Publishing (ASCAP)

Personnel
Demi Lovato – lead vocals, composition
Mitch Allan – composition, production, vocal production, programming, bass, keyboards, guitar, percussion
John Ho – composition, co-production
Bianca "Blush" Atterberry – composition, background vocals
Andy Guerrero – engineering
Caleb Hulin – engineering, programming, guitar
Midi Jones – programming, keyboards, piano
Kevin Kadish – piano engineering
Serban Ghenea – mixing
John Hanes – engineering
Chris Gehringer – mastering

Credits adapted from the liner notes of Dancing with the Devil... the Art of Starting Over.

Accolades

Charts

Release history

References

External links
 
 

2020s ballads
2021 singles
2021 songs
Demi Lovato songs
Island Records singles
Pop ballads
Songs written by Demi Lovato
Republic Records singles
Songs written by Mitch Allan
Songs written by Bianca Atterberry